Ancilla may refer to:

 Maid (Latin: ancilla); see also Ancillae
 Ancilla College, US
 Ancilla bit, a bit used in quantum computing
 Ancilla (gastropod), a genus of olive snails

See also
 Ancilla Dei, a title given to a deceased woman in early Christian inscriptions